Keith Irvine Geddes (25 October 1918 – 30 March 1991) was a Scottish rugby union player.

Career
Geddes was educated at Loretto School and Gonville and Caius College, Cambridge.

Geddes played for Cambridge University R.U.F.C. in The Varsity Match in 1938 and served with No. 604 Squadron RAF in World War 2, winning the Distinguished Flying Cross.

He also played for London Scottish FC.

He was the son of Irvine Geddes, who was also capped for Scotland and who also captained Scotland, in the Calcutta Cup match of 1908.

References

Bibliography
 Bath, Richard (ed.), The Scotland Rugby Miscellany. Vision Sports Publishing Ltd, 2007. .
 Griffiths, John, The Phoenix Book of International Rugby Records. Phoenix House / J. M. Dent & Sons, London, 1987.  

1918 births
1991 deaths
People educated at Loretto School, Musselburgh
Cambridge University R.U.F.C. players
London Scottish F.C. players
Recipients of the Distinguished Flying Cross (United Kingdom)
Royal Air Force personnel of World War II
Scotland international rugby union players
Scottish rugby union players